O Jeong-ryong (born 9 February 1944) is a South Korean wrestler. He competed in the men's freestyle 52 kg at the 1968 Summer Olympics.

References

1944 births
Living people
South Korean male sport wrestlers
Olympic wrestlers of South Korea
Wrestlers at the 1968 Summer Olympics
20th-century South Korean people